Dileep Kamble (born 1 June 1963) is a leader of Bharatiya Janata Party and was a member of 13th Maharashtra Legislative Assembly from Pune Cantonment. Currently he lost his Ministry of State for Social Justice and Special Assistance in Devendra Fadnavis ministry (2014–2019).

Political career

Positions held

Bharatiya Janata Party

Legislative

 Member Maharashtra Legislative Assembly Since October 2014

References

Politicians from Pune
Living people
1963 births
Maharashtra MLAs 2014–2019
Marathi politicians
Bharatiya Janata Party politicians from Maharashtra